Baal is an EP by English musician David Bowie, comprising recordings of songs written for Bertolt Brecht’s play Baal. It is sometimes referred to as David Bowie in Bertolt Brecht's Baal, as credited on the sleeve.
The EP was Bowie's final release of new material for RCA Records; he signed with EMI Records for his next album.

Background
In August 1981, Bowie had begun rehearsals to appear in the BBC version of Baal. The lyrics to the songs were all translated by Ralph Manheim and John Willett. Bowie did not think of the television play as a success on broadcast due to its cinematography, but had grown to appreciate it by 1983. Dominic Muldowney provided all new musical settings, except for "The Drowned Girl", which was a setting by Kurt Weill done originally for Das Berliner Requiem. In September 1981, Bowie and Tony Visconti returned to the Hansa studios in Berlin to re-record the five songs Baal performed in the play.

"Baal's Hymn" is a combination of the vignettes spread throughout the play and establishes Baal's amoral character. "Remembering Marie A." concerns Baal's reminiscences of a past conquest, where he can remember a cloud drifting overhead but not the face of the girl he was with. "Ballad of the Adventurers" is Baal's aggressive lament to the death of his mother. "The Drowned Girl" relates the suicide of one of Baal's conquests – a video clip for this song was shot by David Mallet at the same time as the one for "Wild is the Wind". "The Dirty Song" is a short number, with Baal humiliating his lover Sophie.

Release
Bowie's performance as Baal was transmitted on 2 March 1982, and RCA issued the EP to coincide with this. Both the play and EP were well received, with the latter reaching No. 29 in the UK chart, commendable considering the unconventional tracks.  In addition to the 7" edition, which came packaged in a double gatefold sleeve containing extensive notes pertaining to the musical content and a short biography of Bertolt Brecht, the EP was released as a 12", which gained it some play in clubs as well as radio airplay. It would mark Bowie's final new release for RCA Records. Bowie's next release was issued by EMI.

Reception

Chris O’Leary calls the EP “a kiss-off to a label Bowie had grown to hate” and writes that “Baal is often considered a strange cul-de-sac in Bowie’s career… But Baal, after Scary Monsters, is Bowie’s best record of the decade[1980s].”

Subsequent releases
"The Drowned Girl" was featured on the 2005 triple CD set The Platinum Collection and then the 2007 re-release of its third CD under the title The Best of David Bowie 1980/1987; the latter also included a music video for the song on DVD. "The Drowned Girl" and "Baal's Hymn" are both included on the 2003 and 2014 expanded re-issues of Sound + Vision. The EP was re-released as a digital download in 2007. All five tracks were also included as part of the Re:Call 3 compilation disc, exclusive to the A New Career in a New Town (1977–1982) box set, released in September 2017.

Track listing

Personnel
David Bowie – vocals, guitar, production
Tony Visconti – bass, production
uncredited session musicians – other instruments
Eduard Meyer – engineering

Design
Andrew Christian – art direction
Partridge Rushton – design and artwork
John Timbers (Radio Times) – photography
uncredited photographer – Bertolt Brecht portrait (from In Life, In Pictures, In Text)
Frans Masereel – woodcut illustration (from The Radical Imagination)

References

1982 EPs
David Bowie EPs
Albums produced by Tony Visconti
Albums produced by David Bowie
RCA Records EPs